The 1993 Ukrainian Cup Final is a football match that took place at the Republican Stadium on May 30, 1993. The match was the second final of national cup competition and it was contested by FC Dynamo Kyiv and FC Karpaty Lviv. The 1993 Ukrainian Cup Final was also the second to be held in the Ukrainian capital Kyiv. Dynamo won the match 2:1 with goals from Viktor Leonenko and the former Karpaty player Dmytro Topchiyev. 

The match also had 1 yellow card issued to Mokrytskyi (Karpaty). One of the few Ukrainian Cup finals where there were no foreign players.

Road to Kyiv 

Both teams started from the first round of the competition (1/16). Unlike Dynamo that travelled to Western Ukraine on  three occasions before meeting with the former runner-up of the Ukrainian Cup, FC Metalist Kharkiv, and didn't meet any resistance along the way; Karpaty had a much more difficult road. Lvivians travelled to the South at first and then for the two next rounds they traveled to Zaporizhia. Surprisingly Karpaty had not much of a problem with neither Metalurh nor Torpedo. Karpaty gained a great momentum before going to the Final after the previous couple of rounds and were considered to be great challengers.

Match details

Match statistics

See also
 Ukrainian Cup 1992-93

References

External links 
 Calendar of Matches - Schedule of the 1993 Ukrainian Cup on the Ukrainian Soccer History web-site (ukrsoccerhistory.com). 

Cup Final
Ukrainian Cup finals
Ukrainian Cup Final 1993
Ukrainian Cup Final 1993
Sports competitions in Kyiv